Gustave Zédé may refer to the following ships of the French Navy:

 , a submarine launched in 1893
 , a pair of submarines built for the French Navy just before World War I
 , lead vessel of the class
 , a submarine tender in commission from 1948 to 1971
 , ex-Marcel Le Bihan, ex-Greif, renamed 1978 to 1990

French Navy ship names